Sinas may refer to:

 Sinas (crater), crater on the Moon
 Debold Sinas (born 1965), Filipino police officer
 Georgios Sinas (1783–1856), Greek benefactor and diplomat
 Simon Sinas (1810-1876), Georgios' son, Greek benefactor and diplomat, after whom the Sinas crater is named

See also
Sina (disambiguation)